This is a list of parks in Taiwan, Republic of China.

Taipei
 228 Peace Memorial Park
 Bailing Sport Park
 Bangka Park
 Beitou Park
 Bihu Park
 Chengmei Riverside Park
 Daan Forest Park
 Dahu Park
 Dajia Riverside Park
 Fudekeng Environmental Restoration Park
 Guandu Nature Park
 Guanshan Riverside Park
 Jieshou Park
 Meiti Riverside Park
 Nangang Park
 Nanxing Park
 Rongxing Garden Park
 Sanmin Park
 Shanshuilu Eco Park
 Shingyi Plaza
 Shuangxi Park and Chinese Garden
 Songshan Cultural and Creative Park
 Taipei Botanical Garden
 Taipei Water Park
 Xinzhong Park
 Yingfeng Riverside Park
 Youth Park
 Zhongshan Linear Park

New Taipei
 Erchong Lotus Park
 Erchong Riverside Park
 Kinchen Park
 Stone Sculpture Park

Taichung
 Fengle Sculpture Park
 Lüshun Park
 Taichung Metropolitan Park
 Taichung New Capital Ecological Park
 Taichung Park

Kaohsiung
 Central Park
 Dapingding Tropical Botanical Garden
 Jhongdou Wetlands Park
 Kaohsiung Metropolitan Park
 Kaohsiung Park
 Niaosong Wetland Park
 Shaochuantou Park
 Siaogangshan Skywalk Park
 Water Tower Park
 Weiwuying Metropolitan Park
 Youchang Forest Park

Tainan
 Barclay Memorial Park
 Jacana Ecological Education Park
 Qigu Mangrove Tourist Park
 Shuipingwen Park
 Tainan Metropolitan Park
 Tainan Park
 Tainan Wu Garden
 Tang Te-chang Memorial Park
 Yongkang Park

Chiayi City
 Chiayi Botanical Garden
 Chiayi Park

Hsinchu City
 Huchenghe Riverside Park
 Zhongyang Park

Keelung City
 Chaojing Park
 Heping Island Park
 Zhongzheng Park

Changhua County
 Alice's Garden
 Changhua Fitzroy Gardens
 Yuanlin Park

Chiayi County
 Meishan Park
 Wu Feng Park

Hualien County
 Matai'an Wetland Ecological Park
 Qixingtan Coast Park

Kinmen County
 Houhu Seashore Park
 Jincheng Seaside Park
 Zhongzheng Park

Lienchiang County
 Shengtian Park

Miaoli County
 Dongxing Riverside Park
 Ren'ai Park

Nantou County
 Jiji Military History Park
 Songbailun Natural Park

Pingtung County
 Linhousilin Forest Park
 Longpan Park
 Sheding Nature Park

Taitung County
 Beinan Cultural Park
 Guanshan Waterfront Park
 Taitung Forest Park

Yilan County
 Dongshan River Water Park
 Jiuliao River Ecological Park
 Luodong Forestry Culture Park
 Luodong Sports Park
 Wulaokeng Scenic Area

Yunlin County
 Erlun Sports Park

Penghu County 

 Longgui Park

See also
 List of national parks in Taiwan
 List of tourist attractions in Taiwan

References

External links
 List of Parks in Taipei 
 Taipei City Government — Parks

 
Parks
Taiwan
Parks